Poindimié  is a commune in the North Province of New Caledonia, an overseas territory of France in the Pacific Ocean. The Poindimié Islands, a group of seven tiny islets where seabirds and sea turtles nest, lies off the coast of the commune.

Climate 
Poindimié has a trade-wind tropical rainforest climate (Köppen Af). Although there is no dry season, rainfall does show a strong peak in the late southern summer, and a minimum from August to October.

References

Communes of New Caledonia